DWCI-TV was a commercial television station owned by ABS-CBN Corporation. Its transmitter is located at General Tinio Street Extension, Brgy. H. Concepcion, Cabanatuan, Nueva Ecija.

ABS-CBN TV-32 Nueva Ecija Programs 
 TV Patrol North Luzon

See also
 List of ABS-CBN Corporation channels and stations
 DZRR-TV

ABS-CBN stations
Television stations in Nueva Ecija
Television channels and stations established in 2005